= Giakoumelos =

The Giakoumelos (Greek Γιακουμέλος) family is an old Greek family from the island of Zakynthos, originally found there before 1478. According to the bibliography, it may be a hellenization of the Italian Giacomello or Giacomelli whose family members were found on the island during the Frankish rule.

There are many branches of the Giakoumelos family still extant today, each carrying a nickname to identify them from the others. Among these nicknames are Rorou (Ρορού) and Dairis (Νταΐρης) of which many local leaders of villages on the island of Zakynthos have come historically making them a sort of seigneur of their respective villages, especially the Rorou/Roros branch. Other nicknames include Gialia, Camberi, Cousoula, Malouchos, Roupa, Vardakastani, Dariou, Colovieni, and Rorou
